Over Bjoergvin graater himmerik (English: Heaven cries over Bergen), appears on the album cover as ...Bjoergvin..., is the second full-length album from Norwegian black metal band Taake. It was released on 1 January 2002.

Track listing
All lyrics and music by Hoest.

Personnel

Taake
Hoest – vocals, guitars
C. Corax – guitars 
Keridwen – bass, piano

Additional personnel
 Mutt - Drums
Pytten - Recording 
Herbrand - Recording 
Davide - Recording 
Sgit - Photography

Taake albums
2002 albums